Ingolf Huhn (born in 1955) is a German opera manager and theatre director.

Life 
Born in Magdeburg, after the Abitur Huhn studied opera direction in Berlin, musicology in Leipzig and theology. Afterwards he was a master student at the Academy of Arts with Ruth Berghaus. He then worked for ten years as an opera director at the Meiningen Court Theatre. During this period he was also a frequent guest director at the Graz Opera in Styria/Austria.

Publications 
 Wagners Öffentlichkeitssyndrom.
 Richard Wagners soziales Theaterkonzept : Untersuchungen zu Wagners Entwurf eines gesellschaftlich relevanten Theaters.

References

External links 
 
 Ingolf Huhn on Operabase
 NMZ – Ingolf Huhn
 Kreativität und beneidenswerte Phantasie. Ingolf Huhn: Opern-Archäologe und Realist anlässlich Mangolds „Tanhäuser“ in Annaberg-Buchholz – Interview with Huhn and portrait of the manager by Geerd Heinsen
 Interview with Ingolf Huhn at "Age of Artists"

German opera directors
German theatre directors
1955 births
Living people
People from Magdeburg